DIC Entertainment Corporation (also known as DIC Audiovisuel, DIC Enterprises, DIC Animation City, DIC Entertainment, L.P., and DIC Productions), branded as the Incredible World of DIC, was an international film and television production company that was mostly associated as an animation studio. As a division of The Walt Disney Company, DIC produced live-action feature films and licensed countless anime series.

On June 20, 2008, DIC was acquired by and later folded into Cookie Jar Group. As of 2023, most of the DIC library is currently owned by WildBrain (formerly DHX Media) after the company acquired Cookie Jar on October 22, 2012.

History

1971–1982: DIC Audiovisuel
Diffusion, Information Communications (DIC) was formed in France in 1971 by Jean Chalopin as the production division of Radio Television Luxembourg, a long existing media company.

In 1981, DIC established a partnership with the Japanese animation studio Tokyo Movie Shinsha, as one of the overseas animation subcontractors. They helped animate many of TMS's programs, starting with Ulysses 31. They also produced the unaired pilot Lupin VIII. This partnership lasted until 1996.

1982–1986: Launch of the U.S. arm
DIC Audiovisuel's U.S. arm, DIC Enterprises, was founded in April 1982 in Burbank, California by Andy Heyward, a former story writer at Hanna-Barbera, to translate DIC productions into English. The company produced television animation for both network broadcast and syndication, outsourced its non-creative work overseas, enforced anti-union policies and hired staff on a per-program basis to cut costs. For some in the industry, DIC stood for "Do It Cheap". With directors Bruno Bianchi and Bernard Deyriès, Chalopin and Heyward were able to make DIC an effective but restrained animation company.

Soon after joining DIC, Heyward developed Inspector Gadget, which became a successful production out of the U.S. office. DIC partnered with toy makers and greeting card companies for character based product lines that could be made into animated series. Thus, DIC productions came with built in advertisers and some time financiers. Between Inspector Gadget and The Littles (the latter produced for ABC), the company became profitable.

In 1983, DIC opened its own Japan-based animation facility known as K.K. DIC Asia for animation production on their shows in order to bypass overseas animation subcontractors. 

As the only non-union animation firm, in 1984, DIC faced a unionization effort, which failed. In 1985, LBS Communications, DIC Enterprises, and Karl-Lorimar Home Video set up the Kideo Video line, which gave Karl-Lorimar access to the 200 DIC/LBS combined titles to the videocassette market, with underperforming expectations in its first year, and then farmed out its titles for the British market to The Video Collection. In 1986, LBS Enterprises entered the videocassette market by itself.

In April 1986, DIC launched a syndicated block called Kideo TV with LBS Communications and Mattel. On August 20, DIC Enterprises and LBS Communications inked a deal to launch an eight-pack of animated specials, under the Family Theater branding, and decided to began on a live-action Dennis the Menace project in collaboration with Columbia Pictures Television.

In November 1986, DIC Enterprises decided to grow with a partnership with fellow syndicator Access Syndication, a division of Access Entertainment Group, to handle 65-episode syndicated runs of three half-hour programs, such as Starcom: The U.S. Space Force, Tiffany Blake, and Beverly Hills Teens, for syndication in the fall of 1987, and Bohbot & Cohn would be the third joint partner involved in the projects. During that time, DIC Enterprises inked a partnership with successful home video distributor CBS/Fox Video in order to distribute the animated Dennis the Menace projects, and called for DIC to produce new transitional segments to convert the 6-10 minute stories to allow CBS/Fox to gave them a 75-minute home video movie running time.

1987–1993: Move to North America and Andy Heyward ownership
From late 1986 to 1987, Heyward, along with investors Bear Stearns & Co. and Prudential Insurance Co., bought Chalopin and Radio Television Luxembourg's 52% stake in DIC in a $70 million leveraged buyout and made the U.S. headquarters the company's main base of operations. After the buyout, Chalopin, Bianchi, Deyriès, and producer Tetsuo Katayama left the company to be replaced by Robby London and Michael Maliani as key employees. After selling his shares in DIC, Chalopin retained DIC's original offices in France as well as DIC's Japanese animation facility and formed the company Créativité et Développement (C&D) in 1987 to continue producing animated series, while the Japanese studio was renamed to K.K. C&D Asia, with itself continuing trading until 1996.

After the buyout, DIC was heavily in debt and the foreign rights to their library were sold in 1987 to Saban Productions, who then sold the rights to Chalopin's C&D. At the time, Heyward considered Chalopin an enemy because of the purchase and the situation permanently poisoned DIC and Saban's relationship. DIC sued Saban for damages; in 1991, both companies reached a settlement. By 1987, DIC began expanding its partnership with Saban to co-produce shows with them both, a relationship that would eventually last until the 1990 lawsuit. That year, both DIC and Saban Productions partnered with NBC in order to pick up 26 episodes of I'm Telling! and 13 episodes of The New Archies for the Saturday morning schedule.

In 1987, DIC signed a deal with television broadcast syndicator Coca-Cola Telecommunications, to set up a kids' block that was designed for the morning audience, and two different names were considered, namely Funday Sunday or Funtastic Saturday. Also that year, DIC Enterprises filed a lawsuit against home video distributor Family Home Entertainment, a label of International Video Entertainment, for allegedly breaching a contract to distribute cassettes of the 65-episode syndicated cartoon Dennis the Menace, and claimed that FHE signed a deal with DIC in November 1985 to distribute cassettes, and paid a non-returnable advance against royalties of $1.2 million, and the suit claimed that FHE breached the agreement in April, while DIC forced to enter into a similar contract with the other company that called for an advance payment of $650,000 and the company wanted damages of at least $550,000 and $5 million in punitive damages.

By 1987, DIC Enterprises' parent company was known as DIC Animation City, Inc. DIC also entered the toy industry with the development of the Old MacDonald talking toyline. In June, DIC and LBS settle their lawsuits on Kideo Video, "amicably" out of court, and the cross complaints stemmed from the home video label started in 1985, and the settlement allowed Lorimar Home Video to continue distributing for the home video market, certain kids' animated programs, and called for LBS and DIC to have right to enter into separate home video agreements independently of each other, and the rights of one of the companies could be independent of each other and also independent of Lorimar Home Video. The issue was raised of a joint account the LBS was managing and was allegedly trafficked in and out of the Cayman Islands, and the two companies involved such animated kids programs as Inspector Gadget, Heathcliff, The Adventures of Teddy Ruxpin, and M.A.S.K., and there would be wrongdoing in the $250 million account in participation of LBS. That year in December, DIC was farming out two syndicated strips despite animation company layoffs, kids' overall viewing being down and a highly competitive marketplace that was surrounded by product, and the two strips introduced were the 65-episode series COPS, distributed by Claster Television, and a 40-episode cartoon series, Camp California, which was set to be distributed by Access Entertainment Group, and stations would have to need to accept it for a single year. That month, DIC arranged a deal to merge with Computer Memories, Inc., a former computer component manufacturer and then public shell company. A dissident Computer Memories shareholder scuttled the deal in February 1988. Also that year, DIC signed a deal with Golden Book Video to market titles under the DIC Video brand.

With the buyout debt still a burden, the animation market beginning to soften with the rise of videotape viewing and a glut of new shows and new kids' cable channels, Japanese contract animation companies rates increased 40% from 1986 to 1988 due to the yen exchange rate. In 1987, DIC moved production of Dennis the Menace to a Canadian animation firm for grants and tax breaks from the Canadian government. The company started moving some work to Korea and Taiwan. By the 1987–1988 season, DIC had shows on all three major networks Saturday mornings: six half-hours of shows and 50 half-hours per week in syndication.

Prudential Insurance Co. purchased additional equity of DIC Animation City in August 1989 while increasing DIC's debt capacity. For the 1989–1990 season, DIC provided 30% of the networks' Saturday morning schedule with a total of 60 hours per week on networks, local stations, and cable channels. Four new programs debuted that season on cable and syndication.

On September 11, 1989, DIC launched the 26-hours-a-week Funtown programming block on the CBN Family Channel. DIC was also to produce four specials, with the first launching on Funtown with the others, mostly holiday specials, for the fourth quarter of 1989. A special based on The New Archies was slated for the first quarter of 1990.

Throughout the early 1990s, DIC entered into partnerships with Italian studio Reteitalia, S.p.A. and Spanish network Telecinco, both owned by the Fininvest group, and co-produced shows with them both, with Silvio Berlusconi Communications handling international distribution of DIC's programs. In 1992, DIC signed a distribution deal with Bohbot Communications to handle distribution of these programs, such as Adventures of Sonic the Hedgehog. By the early 1990s, DIC also operated a subsidiary, Rainforest Entertainment, led by Kevin O'Donnel, which produced the cartoon Stunt Dawgs. Later on, in 1992, DIC entered into a strategic partnership with Rincon Children's Entertainment, a joint venture with BMG to launch two new subsidiaries DIC Tune-Time, for audio and DIC Toon-Time Video, for a home video label.

On June 10, 1993, DIC started up an educational unit. On July 12, Buena Vista Home Video signed a multimillion-dollar multiyear North American licensing deal with DIC which included over 1,000 half-hours worth of animated content from the studio, alongside the creation of a dedicated home video label and interactive and multimedia opportunities. The first DIC VHS releases under the new deal were released in early 1994, with the label being branded as DIC Toon-Time Video.

1993–2000: Limited partnerships with Capital Cities/ABC and Disney 
After reportedly being in talks with a buyout from Capital Cities/ABC and PolyGram, on July 26, 1993, DIC Animation City and Capital Cities/ABC Video Enterprises, Inc. formed a Delaware limited partnership joint venture called DIC Entertainment, L.P. to control DIC's production library and provide material for CAVE to distribute in the international market. Heyward retained a small ownership stake in the limited partnership. DIC Animation City was supposed to remain as an independent company but was subsequently folded a year later. The two companies later formed another Delaware limited partnership called DIC Productions, L.P., which owned the production/distribution venture of animated and live-action programming for the children's television and video markets. Capital Cities/ABC owned a 95% majority stake in the venture, while Heyward owned the remaining 5%. Both limited partnerships eventually became the successor to DIC Animation City.

In November 1993, DIC formed a multimedia unit called DIC Interactive. With this, the company moved their headquarters to a larger building in the Burbank area. In an effort to cash in on the success of rival producer Saban with the Mighty Morphin' Power Rangers series, DIC countered and signed a deal with Japanese producer Tsuburaya Productions and subsidiary Ultracom, to adapt Tsuburaya's Japanese program Gridman the Hyper Agent, and turned into the series Superhuman Samurai Syber Squad, which would eventually air from 1994 to 1995.

In 1994, DIC launched a live-action television unit. In the same year, DIC and Capital Cities/ABC launched two children's blocks, Dragon Club and Panda Club, in China. Also that same year, it signed a deal with SeaGull Entertainment, a new syndicated company formed by LBS Communications employee Henry Siegel.

In October 1995, DIC decided to open an animation office in France in partnership with Hampster Productions, which at the time, was 33% minority owned by DIC's majority owner Capital Cities/ABC. In March 1997, the studio was opened up and was named Les Studios Tex, which DIC was a shareholder in.

In January 1996, DIC became part of The Walt Disney Company conglomerate following Disney's acquisition of Capital Cities/ABC. In the same year, the company launched a feature-film unit known as DIC Films and signed a first-look deal with Walt Disney Pictures, which was later extended in 1998.

DIC launched a direct to video division in April 1998 with Riley Katherine Ellis, a Caravan Pictures producer, hired as division head. The first release planned was Madeline: Lost in Paris in spring 1999, with all the division's releases to be distributed by Buena Vista Home Entertainment. In May, DIC signed a deal to provide a children's programming block, Freddy's Firehouse, for the Pax TV network.

2000–2004: Return to independent 
In September 2000, Andy Heyward, backed by investment firms Bain Capital and Chase Capital Partners, began to purchase DIC from The Walt Disney Company. Disney agreed to sell back the company and the deal was closed on November 25, officially allowing DIC to produce shows alone again without the limitations of Disney, coinciding with the relaunch of DIC's international sales division at MIPCOM that year.

In 2001, DIC announced their return to the home video market, forming a new division titled DIC Home Entertainment and begun releasing products, starting in May 2001. This was delayed due to DIC's issues in finding a distributor partner, which eventually happened in July when DIC signed a deal with Lions Gate Home Entertainment for North American distribution of DIC Home Entertainment products. In June, DIC intended to purchase Golden Books Family Entertainment for $170 million, but they eventually backed out of the deal due to the high costs of the purchase and the company was instead co-purchased by Random House for the book rights and Classic Media for the entertainment rights.

At the beginning of 2002, a new parent company called DIC Entertainment Corporation was formed to hold DIC's assets, including DIC Entertainment, L.P. and their stake in Les Studios Tex. In July, DIC purchased the Mommy & Me preschool label.

In January 2003, DIC announced three syndicated children's programming E/I blocks called DIC Kids Network. In April, DIC sued Speed Racer Enterprises, alleging that SRE had sub-licensed the worldwide exploitation rights for Speed Racer to DIC the previous year and then ended the agreement without DIC knowing. Later in July, DIC signed a television production deal with POW! Entertainment for Stan Lee's Secret Super Six, a series about teens with alien superpowers who are taught about humanity by Lee.

2004–2008: Going public and final years
In 2004, Heyward purchased Bain Capital's interest in DIC and took the company public the following year on the London Stock Exchange's Alternative Investment Market under the symbol DEKEq.L.

In 2005, Mexico City-based Ánima Estudios considered forming a partnership with DIC, but decided against in order to focus on its own projects.

In March 2006, DIC re-acquired the international rights to 20 of their shows from The Walt Disney Company and Jetix Europe, who had owned them since Disney bought the previous owners Saban Entertainment in 2001. Later in June, the company acquired the Copyright Promotions Licensing Group. In the same month, Jeffrey Edell joined DIC as president and COO.

DIC Entertainment, KOL (AOL's kids online), and CBS Corporation agreed to a new three hour long programming block for Saturday mornings on CBS called KOL Secret Slumber Party, which was launched on September 15, 2006. On September 15, 2007, a new programming block KEWLopolis premiered, a joint venture between DIC, CBS, and American Greetings.

In April 2007, DIC Entertainment, Nelvana, and NBC Universal Global Networks announced plans to launch KidsCo, a new international children's entertainment network.

The same year in October, DIC sued the Dam company, claiming that they alleged claims of fraud in the inducement and negligent misrepresentation in connection with Dam's troll doll, and DIC's Trollz, which was created after DIC licensed the brand from Dam. Dam counter-sued DIC, claiming that the company financially misrepresented its ability to create and market a modern troll doll toy campaign and destroyed the image and goodwill of the doll.

2008–2012: Cookie Jar Group and DHX Media purchases and legacy
In June 2008, DIC Entertainment and Canadian media company Cookie Jar Group announced an agreement to merge, the transaction being estimated at $87.6 million. President Jeffrey Edell was instrumental in closing the deal and led the merger with Cookie Jar. The merger was completed on July 23 and the company became a subsidiary of Cookie Jar. Shortly after the purchase, Cookie Jar folded DIC into their own operations. Cookie Jar was in turn acquired by DHX Media on October 22, 2012.

In 2008, DIC Kids Network was renamed to Cookie Jar Kids Network, until the block closed down in 2011. Cookie Jar had also produced the final season of Sushi Pack, one of DIC's final shows, lasting until 2009, when KEWLopolis on CBS was renamed to Cookie Jar TV, until the block closed down in 2013, when it was replaced by CBS Dream Team, a block produced by Litton Entertainment. Cookie Jar also had a block on This TV beginning in 2008 with Cookie Jar Toons, which carried shows from Cookie Jar and DIC, and lasted until 2013. Cookie Jar itself closed down in 2014.

In 2009, Andy Heyward founded A Squared Entertainment (A²) with his wife, Amy. A Squared was a brand management, and licensing company that represents third-party properties across a broad range of categories in territories around the world. It held licenses that DIC couldn't get off the ground. In 2013, A Squared merged with Genius Brands to form Genius Brands International, with Heyward serving as CEO to this day.

DHX Media (now known as WildBrain) has also produced reboots based on DIC properties, such as the 2015 reboot of Inspector Gadget, as well as the 2019 reboot of Carmen Sandiego for Netflix, as well as producing a new Sonic the Hedgehog series, Sonic Prime for that network.

DIC has been parodied multiple times, including in the Adult Swim animated series Robot Chicken, with the most notable example being "Welcome to the Golf Jam" in the episode "CatDog on a Stick". The studio itself was parodied as "GiK Entertainment" in the show Saturday Morning All Star Hits! for Netflix.

Programming blocks
 DIC Kids Network – a set of three syndicated children's programming E/I blocks announced in January 2003.
 Chinese blocks with ABC:
 Dragon Club (1994–unknown)
 Panda Club (1994–unknown)
 CBS broadcast blocks, both with one additional partner:
 KOL Secret Slumber Party – a three-hour long block launched on September 16, 2006, a programming block with partner KOL (AOL's kids online).
 KEWLopolis – launched on September 15, 2007, a programming block with partner American Greetings.

Freddy's Firehouse
Freddy's Firehouse (FFH) was a children's educational programming block produced by DIC Entertainment and distributed by Buena Vista International Television, both Disney affiliates in May 1998. At the block's start, most of the programming would be from DIC's library and was planned to air on Pax TV for two years with it running on weekends with three hours on Saturday and two hours on Sunday. Buena Vista would be free to sell to other outlets international. However, Pax went with its own Cloud Nine block, which itself would also contain DIC programmes.

Funtown
Funtown was a programming block on the CBN Family Channel. The block was launched on September 11, 1989, with 26-hours-a-week programming. DIC was tasked with the advertising sales while the Family Channel handled distribution and marketing. Funtown ran from 7 to 9 a.m. on weekdays and from 4 to 6 p.m. and 8 a.m. to 11 a.m. on weekends. The line up of shows was a mix of formats, from live action-animated hybrids to live-action, and programs ranging from original to off-network shows, whether produced by DIC or other companies. In addition, a companion club program was supposed to be developed. DIC was also going to produce four specials each quarter with the launching of Funtown, combined with the others, mostly holiday specials, for the fourth quarter of 1989.

Kideo TV

Kideo TV was a programming block by DIC with LBS Communications and Mattel. Metromedia stations agreed to carry the block by January 1986. Kideo TV was launched in April 1986. Series in the block included Rainbow Brite, Popples and Ulysses 31, plus The Get Along Gang reruns.

Productions

References

External links
  (archived)
 DiC Entertainment Cartoons at the Big Cartoon Database

French companies established in 1971
2008 disestablishments in California
American companies disestablished in 2008
American animation studios
Canadian animation studios
Children's television
Companies based in Los Angeles County, California
WildBrain
Former subsidiaries of The Walt Disney Company
French animation studios
Mass media companies disestablished in 2008
Mass media companies established in 1971